The  and  are limited express train services in Japan operated jointly by the East Japan Railway Company (JR East) and Tobu Railway between  in Tokyo and  in Tochigi Prefecture.

Station stops
Kinugawa and Spacia Kinugawa services alike stop at the following stations.

Rolling stock
Since 4 June 2011, Kinugawa services are formed of refurbished 253-1000 series 6-car EMU sets, and Spacia Kinugawa services are formed of Tobu 100 series Spacia EMUs. Prior to 4 June 2011, JR East services were formed of a dedicated 6-car 485 series EMU set, which was occasionally substituted by a reserve 189 series set nicknamed .

History

From the start of the revised timetable on 16 March 2013, Kinugawa services also stop at Urawa Station.

See also
 List of named passenger trains of Japan
 Nikkō - a similar service between Shinjuku and Tōbu Nikkō, also jointly operated by JR East and Tobu

References

External links
 JR East 485 series Nikkō/Kinugawa 

Named passenger trains of Japan
East Japan Railway Company
Tobu Railway
Railway services introduced in 2006
2006 establishments in Japan